The Museum of the Ara Pacis (Italian: Museo dell'Ara Pacis) belongs to the Sistema dei Musei in Comune of Rome (Italy); it houses the Ara Pacis of Augustus, an ancient monument that was initially inaugurated on 30 January 9 B.C.

Structure

Designed by the American architect Richard Meier and built in steel, travertine, glass and plaster, the museum is the first great architectural and urban intervention in the historic centre of Rome since the Fascist era. It is a structure with a triumphal nature, clearly alluding to the style of imperial Rome. Wide glazed surfaces allow the viewer to admire the Ara Pacis with uniform lighting conditions.

The white color is a hallmark of Richard Meier's work, while the travertine plates decorating part of the building reflect design changes (aluminum surfaces were initially planned), that came after a design review to consider controversies where nostalgia arose for the previous pavilion that was built on the site in 1938 by the architect  Vittorio Ballio Morpurgo.

Meier's ambitious project imposes itself into the heart of the city, becoming a nerve center and exchange center. In its completed form, the complex is intended to have a pedestrian path allowing a direct connection to the Tiber, via an underpass. Presently the underpass design seems inactive.

History

The museum was initially made during the Fascist era as part of Mussolini's reconfiguration of Piazza Augusto Imperatore. This location was chosen for the museum due to its proximity to the Mausoleum of Augustus and the newly built surrounding Fascist architecture. 

The current building, designed by architect Richard Meier, was inaugurated and opened to the public after seven years of works, on 21 April 2006 (the anniversary of the traditional date of the foundation of Rome).

During the night of 31 May 2009, unknown persons defaced the white outer wall with green and red paint and placed a toilet bowl at the foot of the wall.

On 12 December 2009, a group of activists of Earth First!, during the Copenhagen Summit, colored the water of the fountain green and affixed on the side facing Via Tomacelli a banner saying "Earth First! Act Now". The officers and the employees of the museum intervened immediately, removing the banner and emptying the fountain.

Criticisms
The building has attracted conflicting opinions. The New York Times judged it a flop, while the famous art critic and polemicist Vittorio Sgarbi called it, "A Texas gas station in the very earth of one of the most important urban centres in the world", and the first step towards an "internationalisation" of the city of Rome.
Nonetheless, opinion was not unanimous  and, for instance, Achille Bonito Oliva praised Meier's design.

In November 2013 a faulty roof allowed water to leak into the building during heavy rain. Staff members had to use buckets to remove water from the top of the altar.

During one of his first declarations after being elected Mayor of Rome in April 2008, Gianni Alemanno announced his intention to remove Meier's building, on the grounds that the Roman right wing had always disapproved of the new building and the destruction of a piece of Fascist history. However, Alemanno himself later pointed out that the removal was not a priority of his administration.

Notes

Bibliography
Sebastiano Brandolini. 2008. Rome: new architecture. Milan: Skira. .
Federico Del Prete. 2006. Ara Pacis. Rome: Punctum. .
Maria José Strazzulla. 2009. "War and Peace: Housing the Ara Pacis in the Eternal City." American Journal of Archaeology 113.2 (open access)

External links

Photographic documentation about the Museum of the Ara Pacis

 
Museums in Rome
Richard Meier buildings
Art museums and galleries in Rome
Archaeological museums in Italy
Museums of ancient Rome in Italy
Museums established in 2006
Rome R. IV Campo Marzio